There were two different Norton Rural Districts in different parts of England

Norton Rural District (Derbyshire)
Norton Rural District (Yorkshire)